Wenzel Lorenz Reiner (8 August 1686 or 1689 – 9 October 1743) was a Baroque painter who lived and died in Prague, Bohemia.

Gallery

External links

Short biography 
Gallery 
Neue Deutsche Biographie 

1689 births
1743 deaths
German Bohemian people
18th-century German painters
18th-century German male artists
German male painters
Czech painters
Czech male painters
Czech baroque painters
Artists from Prague